Karl Raupp (2 March 1837 in Darmstadt – 14 June 1918 in Munich) was a German landscape and genre painter.

Biography
After studying genre painting under Jakob Becker at the Städel Institute in Frankfurt, he became a pupil and zealous follower of Piloty in Munich (1860–65), where he soon gathered a small school. After 1865, he opened a studio, taking private pupils in painting. In 1868 his reputation as a teacher gained for him the position of professor in the art school at Nuremberg, where he stayed until 1879, when he returned to his former residence to become professor at the art academy in Munich.

Works
His finely colored scenes from fishermen's and peasant life around Chiem Lake, which form his favorite subjects, show equal devotedness in the treatment of landscape and figures, and include:

“In the Face of the Storm” (1885, Dresden Gallery)
“Peace” (1889, National Gallery, Berlin)
“Serious Meeting” (1889, Münster Gallery)
“Chiem Lake” (1898, Reichstags-Gebäude, Berlin)
“A Boating Party on Chiem Lake”
“Home Before a Storm”
“A Calm”
“Ave Maria”
“Sport and Work”
“Starting Home from the Monastery School”

He published a Katechismus der Malerei (Painting catechism; 3d ed. 1898).

Notes

References
 
 

1837 births
1918 deaths
19th-century German painters
19th-century German male artists
German male painters
20th-century German painters
20th-century German male artists
Artists from Darmstadt
Artists from Munich
Academic staff of the Academy of Fine Arts, Nuremberg